Monomorium denticulatum is a species of ant in the subfamily Myrmicinae. It known from Chile and Argentina. Like M. bidentatum it was first described from Valdivia, Chile.

Description
Workers are 3 mm long, yellowish red, with brown head, petiole and abdomen. Females are 4 mm long and brownish black, with only the most distal tarsal elements and the tip of the abdomen reddish yellow.

Footnotes

References
 

denticulatum
Hymenoptera of South America
Fauna of Argentina
Insects described in 1887
Taxa named by Gustav Mayr